Bullard Block is a historic commercial building located at Schuylerville in Saratoga County, New York. It was built in 1881 and is a rectangular two story brick building on a limestone foundation in the High Victorian Gothic style.  It has five storefront bays and originally housed the National Bank of Schuylerville.

It was listed on the National Register of Historic Places in 2009.

References

External links

Commercial buildings on the National Register of Historic Places in New York (state)
Commercial buildings completed in 1881
Gothic Revival architecture in New York (state)
Buildings and structures in Saratoga County, New York
National Register of Historic Places in Saratoga County, New York
1881 establishments in New York (state)